Ajjapanahalli, Kolar  is a village in the southern state of Karnataka, India. It is located in the Kolar taluk of Kolar district in Karnataka. It connects to Chennai-Bangalore National Highway (Mulbagal Road) and the restaurants like Polar bear, Maiyas, Domino's Pizza, Adigas restaurant are present here. Ajjapanahalli is almost 3-4 kilometres away from R L Jalappa Hospital and SDUMC, Tamaka, Kolar.

See also
 Kolar
 Districts of Karnataka

References

External links
 http://Kolar.nic.in/

Villages in Kolar district